Amiruddin Bagus Kahfi Alfikri (born 16 January 2002) is an Indonesian professional footballer who plays as a forward for Greek Super League club Asteras Tripolis.

Club career 
Bagus Kahfi is a former youth academy player of PSSA Asahan and Barito Putera. On 5 February, he joined Eredivisie club Utrecht on a contract until June 2022. This made him the first Indonesian footballer to sign a professional contract with a Dutch club. He made his professional debut for club's reserve side Jong Utrecht on 27 August 2021 in a 3–0 league win against Telstar.

On 22 August 2022, Kahfi signed for Greek Super League club Asteras Tripolis, until June 2023.

International career 
Bagus Kahfi is a current Indonesian youth international. He was part of Indonesia squad that won the 2018 AFF U-16 Youth Championship.

In October 2021, Bagus was called up to the Indonesia U23 in a friendly match against Tajikistan and Nepal and also prepared for 2022 AFC U-23 Asian Cup qualification in Tajikistan by Shin Tae-yong. Bagus made his debut for Indonesia U23, on 19 October 2021, by starting in a 2–1 win against Tajikistan U23.

Personal life 
Bagus Kahfi was born in Magelang, Central Java. He is the twin brother of Bagas Kaffa who plays for Liga 1 club Barito Putera.

Career statistics

Honours

International 
Indonesia U16
 AFF U-16 Youth Championship: 2018
Indonesia U19
 AFF U-19 Youth Championship third place: 2019

Individual 
 AFF U-16 Youth Championship Top scorer: 2018
 AFF U-19 Youth Championship Top scorer: 2019

References

External links 
 

2002 births
People from Magelang
Sportspeople from Central Java
Living people
Association football forwards
Indonesian footballers
Indonesia youth international footballers
Eerste Divisie players
Super League Greece players
Jong FC Utrecht players
Asteras Tripolis F.C. players
Indonesian expatriate footballers
Expatriate footballers in the Netherlands
Indonesian expatriate sportspeople in the Netherlands
Expatriate footballers in Greece
Indonesian expatriate sportspeople in Greece
Indonesian twins
Twin sportspeople